Notre Dame Cristo Rey High School is a Roman Catholic high school in Methuen, Massachusetts, United States, in the Roman Catholic Archdiocese of Boston. Founded in 2004 by the Sisters of Notre Dame de Namur, it follows the Cristo Rey Network work-study model.

A $5-million renovation was completed in 2009. In 2011, the school received accreditation from the New England Association of Schools and Colleges.
Approximately ninety percent of the student enrollment is Hispanic.

Notre Dame High School is a member of the Massachusetts Interscholastic Athletic Association, competing in boys' cross country, basketball, and baseball; girls' cross country, basketball, and softball.

References

External links
 School website

Buildings and structures in Methuen, Massachusetts
Catholic secondary schools in Massachusetts
Schools in Essex County, Massachusetts
Educational institutions established in 2004
Cristo Rey Network
Lawrence, Massachusetts
Sisters of Notre Dame de Namur schools
Poverty-related organizations
2004 establishments in Massachusetts